Sorry to Bother You is a 2018 American surrealist black comedy film written and directed by Boots Riley, in his directorial debut. It stars Lakeith Stanfield, Tessa Thompson, Jermaine Fowler, Omari Hardwick, Terry Crews, Patton Oswalt, David Cross, Danny Glover, Steven Yeun, and Armie Hammer. The film follows a young black telemarketer who adopts a white accent to succeed at his job. Swept into a corporate conspiracy, he must choose between profit and joining his activist friends to organize labor.  

Principal photography began in June 2017 in Oakland, California. Sorry to Bother You premiered at the Sundance Film Festival on January 20, 2018, and was theatrically released in the United States on July 6, 2018, by Annapurna Pictures. The film received critical acclaim for its cast, concept, and soundtrack, as well as Riley's screenplay and direction.

Plot
Cassius "Cash" Green lives in his uncle Sergio's garage with his girlfriend, Detroit, an artist. Struggling to pay rent, Cash gets a job as a telemarketer for RegalView. Cash has trouble with customers until Langston, an older co-worker, teaches him to use his "white voice" and adopt a blithe, affluent persona on calls, at which Cash excels.

Cash's coworker Squeeze forms a union and recruits Cash, Detroit, and their friend Sal. When Cash participates in a protest, he expects to be fired but is instead promoted to an elite Power Caller position. In the luxurious Power Caller suite, Cash is told by the lead Power Caller, Mr. ___, to always use his white voice. He learns that RegalView secretly sells military arms as well as cheap labor from the corporation WorryFree, through which employees sign lifetime contracts to work and be housed in factories, which many condemn as slave labor.

Though Cash is initially uncomfortable with the job, he is celebrated at work and can now afford a new apartment, a flashy new car, and pays off Sergio's house (in the process keeping him from joining WorryFree). He stops participating in the union push and Detroit quits her RegalView job to avoid conflicting loyalties between the two, while secretly participating in the Left Eye Faction, an anti-WorryFree activist movement. She breaks up with Cash, arguing that his immoral job has changed him, while he insists he has the right to be proud of his success. He later attends Detroit's art exhibit and artistic performance uninvited, at which she uses a white voice of her own. When Cash is escorted through the union's picket line one morning, a picketer wounds him with a can of soda. Footage of the incident becomes an Internet meme; the thrower profits off of it herself, even signing a sponsorship with the brand of the soda she threw.

Cash is invited to a party with WorryFree CEO Steve Lift, where he is goaded into rapping for the predominantly white guests. In a private meeting, Lift offers Cash a powdered substance which Cash snorts, believing it is cocaine. Looking for the bathroom, Cash discovers shackled half-horse, half-human hybrids who beg him for help. Lift explains that WorryFree plans to make their workers stronger, more obedient, and thus more profitable by transforming them into hybrid "Equisapiens" through snorting a gene-modifying powder. Cash fears that he just ingested the substance, but Lift assures him it was cocaine. Cash refuses an offer of $100 million to become an Equisapien for five years and act as a false revolutionary figure to keep the employees in line.

Cash discovers he dropped his phone when he encountered the Equisapiens, who recorded a plea for help and sent it to Detroit. Taking advantage of his infamy as a meme, Cash appears on the extremely popular television show I Got the Shit Kicked Out of Me, enduring humiliations and beatings to share the video, and spreads the word about WorryFree's cruelty. The plan backfires: Equisapiens are hailed as a groundbreaking scientific advancement, a cult of personality worshipping Lift develops, and WorryFree's stock reaches an all-time high.

Cash apologizes to Squeeze, Sal, and Detroit, and rallies the union in a final stand against RegalView. He uses a security code from the Equisapien's video to break into Lift's home. He goes to the picket line, where the police start a riot and detain Cash, but the Equisapiens overpower them and free him. Detroit and Cash reconcile and later move back into Sergio's garage. Cash suddenly starts to grow horse nostrils. Later, fully transformed, he leads a mob of Equisapiens to Lift's house and breaks down the door.

Cast
 Lakeith Stanfield as Cassius "Cash" Green
David Cross as Cash's white voice
 Tessa Thompson as Detroit, Cash's girlfriend
 Lily James as Detroit's white voice
 Jermaine Fowler as Salvador
 Omari Hardwick as Mr. ___, the head Power Caller
 Patton Oswalt as Mr. ___'s white voice
 Terry Crews as Sergio Green, Cash's uncle
 Danny Glover as Langston
Ryan Coursey as Langston's white voice (uncredited)
 Steven Yeun as "Squeeze", a union organizer
 Armie Hammer as Steve Lift, WorryFree CEO
 Kate Berlant as Diana DeBauchery
 Forest Whitaker as First Equisapien / Demarius
 Rosario Dawson as Voice in Power Caller Elevator

Production

Boots Riley describes the film as "an absurdist dark comedy with aspects of magical realism and science fiction inspired by the world of telemarketing". The screenplay for Sorry to Bother You was inspired by his own time working as a telemarketer and telefundraiser in California and his need to put on a different voice to find success. Riley finished the screenplay in 2012, and with no means to produce it, recorded an album of the same title with his band The Coup, inspired by the story. The screenplay was originally published in full as part of McSweeney's issue 48 in 2014.

In June 2017, it was announced that production would go forward on Sorry to Bother You, directed by Riley, and that Lakeith Stanfield, Tessa Thompson and Steven Yeun had been cast in the film. Nina Yang Bongiovi and Forest Whitaker of Significant Productions served as producers, along with Jonathan Duffy, Kelly Williams, Charles D. King and George Rush. Financing was provided by Significant Productions, MACRO, and Cinereach. The same month, Armie Hammer, Jermaine Fowler, Omari Hardwick and Terry Crews also joined the cast. In July 2017, Danny Glover, David Cross and Patton Oswalt joined the cast, with Kate Berlant, Robert Longstreet and Michael Sommers added later that month.

Filming
Principal photography began on June 22, 2017, in Oakland, California, and concluded on July 30, 2017.

It was rumored that Steve Buscemi performed Danny Glover's character's "white voice", but Riley said it was actually the film's sound engineer.

Following the premiere at Sundance, producer Megan Ellison gave Riley $200,000 for reshoots and an additional scene.

Music
The film score was composed and performed by Tune-Yards. Riley and The Coup recorded an original soundtrack for the film as well, which was released June 13, 2018. The first single, "OYAHYTT", featuring Lakeith Stanfield, was released July 13, 2018.

Themes

Capitalism
Boots Riley has said that the film offers a radical class analysis of capitalism, not a specific analysis of the United States under President Donald Trump. He wrote the initial screenplay during Barack Obama's administration, and the target was never any specific elected official or movement, but "the puppetmasters behind the puppets." While most of the final script remained the same, minimal changes were made to avoid appearing to critique Trump specifically, including removing a line where a character says "Worry Free is making America great again," written before Trump used the line in his 2016 presidential campaign.

False consciousness

The film's title has a double meaning, referencing both the phrase's use by telemarketers and its general usage when telling a person something they might not like to hear, such as the film's anti-capitalist message. According to Riley, "when you're telling someone something that is different from how they view things, different from how they view the world, it feels like an annoyance or a bother. And that's where that comes from." The plot of a strike was used to reflect the need to "organize people in the workplace" and for workers to recognize their power.

Release
The film had its world premiere at the Sundance Film Festival on January 20, 2018. Shortly after, Annapurna Pictures acquired distribution rights. It also screened at South by Southwest on March 12, 2018. The film was initially scheduled to be released on June 29, 2018, but was pushed back a week to July 6, 2018, where it began with a limited release before expanding wider on July 13.

The film had difficulty getting international distribution. On September 18, 2018, Riley announced that Universal Pictures and Focus Features had picked up its international distribution rights. It premiered at the 2018 London Film Festival, followed by a UK release on December 7.

Sorry to Bother You was released on digital copy on October 9, 2018, and on Blu-ray and DVD on October 23.

Reception

Box office
, Sorry to Bother You has grossed $17.5 million in the United States and Canada, and $792,464 in other territories, for a worldwide total of $18.3 million, against a production budget of $3.2 million.

The film earned $727,266 from 16 theaters in its limited opening weekend, for an average of $45,452, the fourth-best average of 2018. It finished 16th at the weekend box office. It had its wide release, in 805 theaters, on July 13, alongside the openings of Skyscraper and Hotel Transylvania 3: Summer Vacation, and was forecast to gross around $3.5 million over the weekend. The film made more on its first day of wide release ($1.5 million) than it had in its full week of limited release ($1.1 million). It went on to gross $4.3 million over the weekend, an increase of 485%, finishing 7th at the box office. The film was added to another 245 theaters in its third week of release and made $2.8 million, finishing 10th.

Critical response
The website's critical consensus reads, "Fearlessly ambitious, scathingly funny, and thoroughly original, Sorry to Bother You loudly heralds the arrival of a fresh filmmaking talent in writer-director Boots Riley." On Metacritic, the film has a weighted average score of 80 out of 100, based on 51 critics, indicating "generally favorable reviews". Audiences polled by PostTrak gave the film an 84% overall positive score and a 72% "definite recommend".

James Berardinelli of ReelViews said "Sorry to Bother You blends conventional comedy with political satire to produce a film that will generate laughter and a sense of discomfort in equal doses." David Sims of The Atlantic wrote, "The story's heightened reality works best when it's barely distinguishable from our own—though it starts to lose steam the more it drifts into fantasy. The movie is at times a mess, but a compelling one, and this debut from Boots Riley should herald a fascinating filmmaking career." Peter Debruge of Variety magazine praised the film, calling it "deliriously creative and ambitious to a fault", but expressed reservations about its second half: "As the movie's allegorical relation to real-world problems blurs, audiences are left to wonder what Riley's point is supposed to be." Jesse Hassenger of The A.V. Club described the film as "often wildly funny, and if its broad arc is familiar stuff about a down-on-his-luck everyman experiencing success but at what cost, at least the plot specifics are unpredictable". Randall Colburn of Consequence of Sound called it "a mess, but a glorious one" and said it "is fun until it's overwhelming, and Riley would likely have benefited from a good editor."

A.A. Dowd of The A.V. Club reviewed the film at the Sundance Film Festival and dissented from his peers, calling it "a scattershot, intermittently pointed satire whose jokes and insights land with about the same (in)frequency." Dowd was critical of the writing and direction: "There's a messy, first-draft quality to how the film fits said ideas together, and a general sloppiness to the execution, with Riley botching the timing on too many jokes ... Sorry To Bother You is plainly a first feature, and that's no insult: Even as some of the film's comedy fell flat for me, I distantly admired its something-to-prove chutzpah."

Accolades

See also
 List of black films of the 2010s

References

Further reading

External links
 
 
 
 

2010s English-language films
2018 black comedy films
2018 comedy films
2018 directorial debut films
2018 films
African-American films
American black comedy films
American satirical films
Annapurna Pictures films
2018 independent films
American independent films
Films about the working class
Films set in Oakland, California
Films shot in California
Films with screenplays by Boots Riley
2010s American films
Surrealist films
Surreal comedy films